John Anthony Hopwood (23 October 1926 – May 2002) was an English cricketer. Hopwood was a right-handed batsman. He was born at Herne Bay, Kent, and was educated at Dulwich College.

Hopwood made a single first-class appearance for the Free Foresters against Cambridge University at Fenner's in 1951. In a match which ended as a draw, Hopwood opened the batting in the Free Foresters first-innings, scoring 8 runs before he was dismissed by Owen Wait, while in their second-innings he again opened the batting and was dismissed by the same bowler for a single run. This was his only first-class appearance.

He died at Fleetwood, Lancashire in May 2002.

References

External links

1926 births
2002 deaths
People from Herne Bay, Kent
People educated at Dulwich College
English cricketers
Free Foresters cricketers